Konstanzer Ach is a river of Bavaria, Germany. It passes through the Großer Alpsee, and flows into the Iller in Immenstadt.

See also
List of rivers of Bavaria

References

Rivers of Bavaria
Rivers of Germany